#Libre is the twleveth studio album by Peruvian singer-songwriter Gian Marco released by 11 y 6 Discos on June 4, 2015.  It was his first release since 2013. Gian Marco also produced the album, making this his debut as a music producer.

Release
The album was released on June 4, 2015 on both physical cd and digital download. A Special Edition of the album was released on June 21, 2016.

Commercial performance
The album got attention for Gian Marco collaborating with his daughter Nicole Zignago on the song Vida De Mi Vida which helped it to have great success throughout Latin America and was certified gold in Perú.
It entered the Billboard Latin Pop Albums chart peaking at #19, becoming Gian Marco's first album to enter that chart. The album received two nominations at the 2015 Latin Grammy Awards.

Track listing
All credits adapted from AllMusic.

Charts

Certifications and sales

Accolades
16th Latin Grammy Awards

|-
|rowspan=2|2015
|style="text-align:center;"|#Libre
|style="text-align:center;"|Best Singer-Songwriter Album
|
|-
|style="text-align:center;"|Vida De Mi Vida
|style="text-align:center;"|Song of the Year
|
|-

References

Gian Marco albums
2015 albums
Spanish-language albums